Alfred James Gough (4 June 1884 – 28 July 1952) was an Australian rules footballer who played for the Carlton Football Club and Geelong Football Club in the Victorian Football League (VFL). 

He returned to Melbourne and played for Essendon Town and Hawthorn in the Victorian Football Association (VFA).In 1914 he was the inaugural coach of the Hawthorn Football Club when they were accepted into the Victorian Football Association (VFA).

Notes

External links 

Alf Gough's profile at Blueseum

1884 births
1952 deaths
Australian rules footballers from Victoria (Australia)
Carlton Football Club players
Geelong Football Club players
Barwon Football Club players
Hawthorn Football Club (VFA) coaches
Essendon Association Football Club players	
Hawthorn Football Club (VFA) players